ICCC is a four-character abbreviation with multiple meanings:

 Imperial College Canoe Club is a society of Imperial College Union.
 Imperial College Caving Club is a society of Imperial College Union.
Imperial College Chamber Choir is a society of Imperial College Union.
 International C-Class Catamaran Championship, a match racing series for C-Class catamarans (under sail), held annually
 International Classification of Childhood Cancer, a standardized system for categorizing childhood malignancies
 International Conference on Climate Change, an annual conference of global warming deniers
 International Conference on Computational Creativity
 International Council of Christian Churches
 International Council of Community Churches
 International Conference on Coordination Chemistry
 International Christian Chamber of Commerce
 Iowa Central Community College
 International Conference on Computer Communications
 Italian Cultural and Community Center at the Logue House in Houston, Texas
 PKP Intercity